John Abercrombie (6 March 1817 – 20 August 1892) was an English first-class cricketer. Abercrombie's batting style is unknown.

While attending the Gonville and Caius College, Cambridge, Abercrombie made a single first-class cricket appearance for Cambridge University in The University Match against Oxford University at Lord's in 1838. He was absent injured in Cambridge University's first-innings, but did return for their second-innings, where he was dismissed for a duck by Alfred Lowth. The fixture was won by Oxford University by 98 runs.

Prior to Cambridge Abercrombie, attended Tonbridge School.

He died at Roxeth, Middlesex on 20 August 1892.

References

External links

1817 births
1892 deaths
Alumni of Gonville and Caius College, Cambridge
English cricketers
Cambridge University cricketers